Bryce Alexander McGowens (born November 8, 2002) is an American professional basketball player for the Charlotte Hornets of the National Basketball Association (NBA). He played college basketball for the Nebraska Cornhuskers.

High school career
McGowens played basketball for Wren High School in Piedmont, South Carolina. As a sophomore, he averaged 26.3 points, 3.8 rebounds and three assists per game, and was named Region 1-4A Player of the Year. He led his team to a Class 4A Upper State runner-up finish. In his junior season, McGowens scored a school-record 65 points in a second round win at the Class 4A playoffs. He averaged 25.3 points, 6.4 rebounds, and 3.1 assists per game as a junior, leading his team to the Class 4A Upper State championship game and repeating as Region 1-4A Player of the Year. For his senior season, McGowens moved to Legacy Early College in Greenville, South Carolina. As a senior, he averaged 21.6 points, 4.7 rebounds, and 3.1 assists per game, earning South Carolina Gatorade Player of the Year honors. He was selected to the Jordan Brand Classic roster.

Recruiting
McGowens was considered a five-star recruit by 247Sports and Rivals, and a four-star recruit by ESPN. On February 10, 2020, he announced his commitment to play college basketball for Florida State. On October 8, 2020, McGowens decommitted from the program. On November 13, 2020, he committed to Nebraska, becoming the highest-ranked recruit in program history and its first five-star recruit.

College career

In his college debut, McGowens scored 25 points in a 75–74 loss to Western Illinois on November 9, 2021. On March 1, 2022, he scored 26 points in a 78–70 win against Ohio State but suffered a hand injury that forced him to miss the following game against Wisconsin. McGowens was named to the Third Team All-Big Ten as well as the All-Freshman Team. He averaged 16.8 points, 5.2 rebounds, and 1.4 assists per game. On March 21, 2022, McGowens declared for the 2022 NBA draft, forgoing his remaining college eligibility.

Professional career

Charlotte Hornets (2022–present)
McGowens was selected with the 40th overall pick by the Minnesota Timberwolves in the 2022 NBA draft before being traded to the Charlotte Hornets. On July 2, 2022, the Hornets announced that they had signed McGowens to a two-way contract. Under the terms of the deal, he split time between the Hornets and their NBA G League affiliate, the Greensboro Swarm. On February 26, 2023, McGowens' deal was converted to a multi-year contract by the Hornets.

Career statistics

College

|-
| style="text-align:left;"| 2021–22
| style="text-align:left;"| Nebraska
| 31 || 31 || 33.3 || .403 || .274 || .831 || 5.2 || 1.4 || .7 || .3 || 16.8

Personal life
McGowens' older brother, Trey, played college basketball for Pittsburgh before transferring to Nebraska. His father, Bobby, was a two-sport athlete in basketball and football at South Carolina State after playing football at Clemson. McGowens' mother, Pam, played basketball for Western Carolina. Both of his parents have coached high school basketball.

References

External links

Nebraska Cornhuskers bio

2002 births
Living people
American men's basketball players
Basketball players from South Carolina
Charlotte Hornets players
Greensboro Swarm players
Minnesota Timberwolves draft picks
Nebraska Cornhuskers men's basketball players
People from Pendleton, South Carolina
Shooting guards